Dominique Vandenberg is a Belgian martial artist, actor and stunt performer.

Vandenberg lives in California, where he has appeared in such movies as Pit Fighter and Mortal Kombat.

Background 
Dominique Vandenberg was born Dominique Horevoets in Waasmont, Belgium. As a young adult, Vandenberg competed in many martial arts competitions, winning most of them, and left school at age sixteen to enroll in a Kunto training course in Okinawa, Japan. After graduating the course in a tie for first rank, Vandenberg returned to Belgium, where he was drafted into the military. Vandenberg volunteered for a post in Germany as it offered a shorter service of eight months (as opposed to a year). Immediately upon his release, Vandenberg began training for an invitational freestyle martial arts competition he had been invited to upon completion of the Kunto course. Vandenberg won the competition with only two months of training but was hit by a car and broke his leg.

Unable to fight in further events, Vandenberg left Belgium to join the French Foreign Legion. Graduating from basic training in the top five, he was allowed to pick his post. Vandenberg chose the elite paratrooper regiment, the 2REP, and, after more training, was sent to Africa. He spent five years in countries such as Chad, Nigeria, and the Central African Republic, fighting to control rebellions. During this time, he met his fiancée, Waruny, a freedom fighter. After their meeting, he returned to fulfill his last eight months of service to the Legion, but when he returned, she had been killed.

Vandenberg then left the Legion for good and traveled to Thailand to fight in their famed freestyle fighting rings, or "iron circles". After winning several bouts, he returned to Europe.

Bibliography 
 The Iron Circle: The True Life Story of Dominique Vandenberg, Dominique Vandenberg and Rick Rever, Volt Press, 2004.

Filmography
 1996 Barb Wire as Officer Frack
 1998 Death Row the Tournament as Louis Gerard (Short)
 1999 The Doorman as Andre Siegel
 2002 The Honorable as Andre Siegel
 2002 Gangs of New York as Dead Rabbit Gang Member
 2004 Skeleton Man as Cottonmouth Joe
 2005 Pit Fighter as Jack Severino
 2006 Inland Empire as Trainyard Worker
 2007 Alien Agent as Sartek
 2009 Charlie Valentine as Dom
 2009 Green Street Hooligans 2 as "Gonzo"
 2009 The Perfect Sleep as Captain Keller
 2009 The Butcher as 1970's IRA Member
 2010 True Legend as Bald One-Eye
 2011 Social Distortion: Machine Gun Blues as Special Agent Delvaux (Short)
 2013 March with the Devil as himself
 2019 Triple Threat as Dom
 2019 The Mercenary as Maxx
 2020 March with the Devil as himself
 2021 Hell Hath No Fury

Stunts
 1995 Mortal Kombat - Stunt Player
 1999 The Doorman - Fight Coordinator
 2002 Gangs of New York - Fight Coordinator
 2003 Detonator - Stunts
 2006 Inland Empire - Stunt Player
 2007 Beowulf - Fight Coordinator

Producer
 1999 The Doorman
 2002 The Honorable
 2019 Gray House
 2019 The Mercenary

Writer
 2013 March with the Devil

References

External links
 

Belgian male film actors
Year of birth missing (living people)
Living people
Belgian emigrants to the United States
21st-century Belgian male actors
Soldiers of the French Foreign Legion